The Smokers is a painting by the Flemish painter Adriaen Brouwer, painted in ca. 1636, probably in Antwerp. It hangs in The Metropolitan Museum of Art, in New York City.

The oil-on-wood painting measures  and is signed by the artist.

Description
The painting is of several young men smoking pipes and drinking beer. A self-portrait of Brouwer appears among them (he is the one turned to face the viewer).  The person depicted at right (in black and white apparel) is painter Jan de Heem.  The person depicted blowing smoke out of his nose is Jan Cossiers

References

1630s paintings
Paintings in the collection of the Metropolitan Museum of Art
Self-portraits